Maurice Chollet (23 December 1927 – 22 February 2017) was a Swiss basketball player. He competed in the men's tournament at the 1948 Summer Olympics and the 1952 Summer Olympics.

Chollet died in Lausanne on 22 February 2017, at the age of 89.

References

External links
 

1927 births
2017 deaths
Swiss men's basketball players
Olympic basketball players of Switzerland
Basketball players at the 1948 Summer Olympics
Basketball players at the 1952 Summer Olympics
Sportspeople from Lausanne